Harper County Courthouse may refer to:

Harper County Courthouse (Kansas), Anthony, Kansas
Harper County Courthouse (Oklahoma), Buffalo, Oklahoma